Brandon Johnson may refer to:

 Brandon Johnson (athlete) (born 1985), American middle-distance track athlete
 Brandon Johnson (linebacker) (born 1983), American football linebacker 
 Brandon Johnson (wide receiver) (born 1998), American football wide receiver
 Brandon Johnson (politician), Illinois politician, member of the Cook County Board of Commissioners, and candidate for Mayor of Chicago
 R. Brandon Johnson (born 1974), American actor and TV host